Bruce John Bullock (born May 9, 1949) is a Canadian former professional ice hockey goaltender who spent parts of three seasons in the National Hockey League in the 1970s with the Vancouver Canucks.

Playing for Clarkson University, Bullock was one of the most decorated college goaltenders of his era. He was named to the NCAA First Team All-American in goal in both 1970 and 1971 (succeeding Hall of Famer Ken Dryden, who took the honor from 1967–69), and was named ECAC Player of the Year in 1971. He also led Clarkson to the 1970 NCAA title game, where they lost to Cornell.

Following his college career, Bullock was signed by the Vancouver Canucks during training camp, and assigned to their farm team, the Rochester Americans. He was then loaned to the Chicago Black Hawks' farm team in Dallas. When a position became available at the Canucks' other farm team, the Seattle Totems, he was assigned there where he completed his rookie pro season. He caught a break in 1972–73, when an injury to Canuck starter Dunc Wilson forced his recall from the minors. He appeared in 13 games for Vancouver, posting a 3–8–3 record with a 4.79 GAA, until his season ended due to a broken finger, requiring surgery.

Bullock spent another four seasons in Vancouver's organization, but never saw substantial NHL action, partially due to hand injuries. He made one start for the club in the 1974–75 campaign, and another appearance in 1976–77. During his minor league career he helped the Seattle Totems upset the USSR national team in an exhibition game, and was instrumental in helping the Tulsa Oilers win the Adams Cup in 1975–76. He was ultimately released by Vancouver in 1977 to make room in the system for high draft picks Glen Hanlon and Murray Bannerman, and played two more seasons with the Phoenix Roadrunners in the Pacific Hockey League before retiring in 1979.

In 16 NHL appearances, Bullock posted a 3–9–3 record with a 4.79 GAA.

Career statistics

Regular season and playoffs

Awards and honors

References

External links
 

1949 births
Living people
Beauce Jaros players
Canadian ice hockey goaltenders
Clarkson Golden Knights men's ice hockey players
Dallas Black Hawks players
Ice hockey people from Toronto
Phoenix Roadrunners (PHL) players
Seattle Totems (CHL) players
Seattle Totems (WHL) players
Tulsa Oilers (1964–1984) players
Undrafted National Hockey League players
Vancouver Canucks players
Canadian expatriate ice hockey players in the United States
AHCA Division I men's ice hockey All-Americans